Fozzy is an American heavy metal band from San Antonio, Texas. Formed in 1999, the group was originally a cover band known as Fozzy Osbourne, which was soon shortened to simply Fozzy. The band's original lineup included lead vocalist Chris Jericho (under the alias Mongoose McQueen) and four members of rap metal group Stuck Mojo: guitarists Rich Ward (under the alias Duke LaRüe) and Ryan Mallam (under the alias The Kidd), bassist Dan Dryden (under the alias Shawn "Sports" Popp), and drummer Frank Fontsere (under the alias KK LaFlame). The band released its self-titled debut album in 2000, which featured covers of various heavy metal songs. In November 2001, Dryden left Fozzy and Stuck Mojo, with Keith Watson (under the alias Claude "Watty" Watson) taking his place.

The group followed up Fozzy with Happenstance in 2002, which included five original songs alongside six covers. During the album's promotional tour, Billy Grey replaced Hallam at several shows, as the regular guitarist pursued a career as a lawyer. By late 2003, Watson had been replaced by Sean Delson and the band had dropped its alter egos and fake backstory. Fozzy's next album, All That Remains, was the last to feature Mallam, who left the band permanently in August 2004. He was replaced later in the year by Mike Martin. The following September, Fontsere also left Fozzy and Stuck Mojo, with Eric Sanders taking his place immediately. By the time the band's fourth studio album Chasing the Grail was announced in March 2009, however, the lineup included Fontsere again.

In February 2010, it was reported that Martin had left Fozzy, which he claimed happened in August 2009 due to "a personal falling out between me and one of the band members over business matters". The guitarist was replaced by the returning Billy Grey, now an official member of the band. Delson left after the subsequent promotional touring cycle due to musical differences, with Paul Di Leo taking his place in September 2011. Di Leo performed on 2012's Sin and Bones and 2014's Do You Wanna Start a War, but was replaced in September 2014 by Loaded bassist Jeff Rouse. Rouse was later replaced by Randy Drake, before Di Leo returned in early 2017 to record Judas. In September 2018, a Fozzy tour was announced which listed Drake returning as the band's touring bassist. Drake would, once again, leave the band in 2020. He would be replaced by P. J. Farley of Trixter.

Members

Current

Former

Touring

Timeline

Lineups

References

External links
Fozzy official website

Fozzy